Thorvald "Thorry" Meyer Kiær (6 January 1888 – 29 June 1968) was a Norwegian industrialist.

He was born in Aker to barrister Georg Fredrik Egidius Kiær and Julie Caroline Helene Løvenskiold. He was a brother of Dakky Kiær, and great-grandson of Otto Joachim Løvenskiold and Thorvald Meyer. In 1914 he married Ingrid Thaulow, a daughter of painter Frits Thaulow. Their daughter Annelise Knudtzon (1914–2006) was a textile artist.

From 1913 Kiær had various administrative positions in the family business, which included forestry and wood-processing industry. From 1938 to 1958 he was chief executive of Orkla Mining Company at Løkken Verk.

References

1888 births
1968 deaths
Businesspeople  from Oslo
Norwegian businesspeople in mining
Norwegian chief executives
20th-century Norwegian businesspeople